Nikolai Feldmann (23 March 1904 – 8 October 1975) was an Estonian athlete. He competed in the men's shot put at the 1928 Summer Olympics.

References

1904 births
1975 deaths
Athletes (track and field) at the 1928 Summer Olympics
Estonian male shot putters
Olympic athletes of Estonia
Place of birth missing